Bengeworth railway station was a station on the Midland Railway between Ashchurch and Evesham. The station was named Bengeworth in order to avoid confusion over other stations in the area which also included Hampton in  their names.

The station opened 1 October 1864. It closed in 1953, but trains continued to use the line until closure in 1963. Some of the land between Hinton on the Green and south of Bengeworth station was given over to housing. The bridge that crossed the main A44 Pershore Road north of the station was removed, and the track bed beyond the road was used as an access road to the nearby water treatment works on Clarks Hill.

References

Further reading

Disused railway stations in Worcestershire
Former Midland Railway stations
Railway stations in Great Britain opened in 1864
Railway stations in Great Britain closed in 1953